Oedipina is a genus of lungless salamanders, which is characterized by their absence of lungs; they instead achieve respiration through their skin and the tissues lining their mouth. Species of Oedipina are endemic to Honduras, Colombia, Costa Rica, Ecuador and Mexico.  The common name of worm salamanders derives from the species' extraordinarily slender form with tiny limbs and digits.

Species
This genus includes the following 40 species:

References

External links 

  
 

 
Amphibian genera
Taxa named by Wilhelm Moritz Keferstein
Taxonomy articles created by Polbot